Kanianthra Mani Chandy (born 25 October 1944) is the Simon Ramo Professor of Computer Science at the California Institute of Technology (Caltech). He has been the Executive Officer of the Computer Science Department twice, and he has been a professor at Caltech since 1989. He also served as Chair of the Division of Engineering and Applied Science at the California Institute of Technology.

Early life and education
Chandy received his Ph.D. from the Massachusetts Institute of Technology in Electrical Engineering with a thesis in operations research. He also earned a Master's from the New York University, and a Bachelor's from the Indian Institute of Technology, Madras.

Career
He has worked for Honeywell and IBM. From 1970 to 1989, he was in the Computer Science Department of the University of Texas at Austin, serving as chair in 1978–79 and 1983–85. He has served as a consultant to a number of companies including IBM and Bell Labs. He also served on the Engineering and Computer Science jury for the Infosys Prize in 2019.

Research
In 1984, along with J Misra, Chandy proposed a new solution to the dining-philosophers problem.

Chandy does research in distributed computing. He has published three books and over a hundred papers on distributed computing, verification of concurrent programs, parallel programming languages and performance models of computing and communication systems, including the eponymous BCMP networks. He described the Chandy–Lamport algorithm together with Leslie Lamport.

Recognition
He received the IEEE Koji Kobayashi Award for Computers and Communication in 1987, the A.A. Michelson Award from the Computer Measurement Group in 1985, and the IEEE Computer Society Charles Babbage Award in 1993.

Chandy was elected a member of the National Academy of Engineering in 1995 for contributions to computer performance modeling, parallel discrete-event simulation, and systematic development of concurrent programs.

He was elected as an ACM Fellow in 2019 "for contributions to queueing networks, performance analysis, distributed and parallel programming, and distributed simulation".

References

External links
 Homepage and Bio at Caltech
 Another Bio and discussion of his work

Indian emigrants to the United States
MIT School of Engineering alumni
University of Texas at Austin faculty
American people of Malayali descent
American computer scientists
20th-century Indian mathematicians
California Institute of Technology faculty
IBM employees
Fellows of the Association for Computing Machinery
Members of the United States National Academy of Engineering
Living people
IIT Madras alumni
Polytechnic Institute of New York University alumni
Scientists from Kottayam
1944 births
American people of Indian descent